Epicnistis is a genus of moths in the family Gracillariidae.

Species
Epicnistis euryscia Meyrick, 1906

External links
Global Taxonomic Database of Gracillariidae (Lepidoptera)

Gracillariinae
Gracillarioidea genera